King of the Arena is a 1933 American pre-Code
Western film written and directed by Alan James. The film stars Ken Maynard, Lucile Browne, John St. Polis, Bob Kortman, Michael Visaroff and James A. Marcus. The film was released on June 1, 1933, by Universal Pictures.

Plot
A former circus performer, Ken Kenton becomes personally involved when a mysterious criminal organization called Black Death appears to be targeting a circus troupe.

Ken is reunited with the circus owner's daughter, Mary Hiller, and crosses the path of Bargoff, a bronco rider who resents Ken and tries to get him killed in a knife-throwing act. After a Russian baron named Petroff assists him when Bargoff robs the circus and kidnaps Mary, it turns out Petroff is the ringleader of the Black Death. A confrontation leaves Ken and Mary safe to proceed with their lives.

Cast 
Ken Maynard as Captain Ken Kenton
Lucile Browne as Mary Hiller 
John St. Polis as Governor
Bob Kortman as Bargoff
Michael Visaroff as Baron Petroff 
James A. Marcus as Colonel Hiller 
Jack Rockwell as Ranger Jack Saunders
Frank Rice as Tin Star
Bobby Nelson as Jimmy Hiller
Jack Mower as Rurales Captain Rodriguez
Tarzan as Tarzan

References

External links 
 

1933 films
American Western (genre) films
1933 Western (genre) films
Universal Pictures films
Films directed by Alan James
American black-and-white films
1930s English-language films
1930s American films